San San-Pond Sak is a wetland lagoon area in Panama. It is listed by the Ramsar Convention group as a site of international importance. Near Changuinola, it can be reached by boat for birdwatching and wildlife viewing it is home to parrots, hawks, herons, West Indian manatees, sloths, sandflies, iguanas, monkeys, sea turtles and snakes. The area is 16,125 hectares (39,850 acres). The area is maintained by the local organization AAMVECONA (Association of Friends and Neighbors of the Coast and Nature). The area includes a "landhouse" with rooms overlooking the Caribbean Sea on one side and the San San River on the other. The territory is used by the Bocatorian and Chiricanian indigenous people.

Ecotourism
Activities offered in the area include:
Manatee tours
sea turtle nesting sight night walk tours 
Bird watching
 Nighttime lizard tour
 Paddling tours 
 Fishing
 Beach walks and tours
 Horseback riding on the beach
 Arts and crafts
 Volunteering

See also
Protected areas of Panama

References

Ramsar sites in Panama
Bocas del Toro Province